Sydney Walter Alfred Newton (1875, Leicester – 1960) was an English photographer.  His father, Alfred, ran a photographic business in Belvoir Street and the family lived above the shop.  After a fire in an adjacent factory, the Newton family and business relocated to 17 King Street, Leicester.

Alfred Newton and Son was the official photographer to Leicester Museum, recording and documenting many objects and artefacts.

Sydney Newton joined the family firm in the early 1890s.  When the work on the Great Central Railway (GCR) began in 1894, Sydney recorded the work in progress.  He was not an official photographer for the GCR but created a photographic archive out of his own enthusiasm for the work.  He recorded the London Extension of the GCR as the work progressed, capturing every aspect of its creation.  Newton also took photographs of the ‘navvies’ working on the construction, as well as the construction itself.

Sydney Newton married at 39 and became a father when he was 45.  For many years he lived at Victoria Park Road, Leicester in a house that he named ‘Finmere’ after one of the stations on the London Extension.

Sydney Newton remained in photography for the rest of his life and the business stayed in King Street until around 1950.  After he sold the King Street shop he moved to a smaller house at Branting Hill in Groby, Leics.  Later moving to live with his son, he died at the age of 85 years, in 1960, at Beverley, East Yorkshire.

The public English Heritage Archive holds 3926 glass negatives taken by Alfred Newton and Son. Two thirds of these photographs relate to the Great Central Railway.

Further reading 

Gary Boyd-Hope and Andrew Sargent,  Railways and Rural Life; S W A Newton and the Great Central Railway

References

External links 
 See historic photographs by Alfred Newton & Son
 Alfred Newton and Sons, Historic England Archive

Photographers from Leicestershire
1875 births
People from Leicester
1960 deaths